International Community School (ICS;) is an international Christian school in Bang Na District, Bangkok. It follows a US curriculum and is jointly accredited by the Western Association of Schools and Colleges (WASC) and by the Association of Christian Schools International (ACSI).

History
In 1981, expatriate families founded a cooperative to educate their children from a biblical worldview. The cooperative continued for 12 years, providing first grade to sixth grade education. In 1990 many of these expatriate families and the Network of International Christian Schools (NICS) met to discuss the feasibility of establishing a Christian school to provide kindergarten through twelfth grade education to the English-speaking international community in Bangkok. In 1993 a suitable site was leased and the name International Community School (ICS) was chosen. The school was located on Soi Prong Jai in the Sathorn area of Bangkok and welcomed 120 students into kindergarten through eighth grade when it opened in August 1993. In the third year of operation the International Community School Educational Foundation assumed ownership and remains the current owner of the school.

In 1998 ICS received accreditation from two US-based accrediting agencies: The Western Association of Schools and Colleges (WASC) and the Association of Christian Schools International (ACSI). The school expanded by one grade each year until it offered a K-12 education. ICS celebrated its first graduating class in 1998.

In 2002 the local school board of International Community School decided that ICS should become independent of NICS in favor of self- governance. ICS enrollment consistently increased, outgrowing the leased facility despite several on-site building projects. The ICS Educational Foundation Board, with the cooperation of the families of ICS, purchased the current 16.2  of land in Bang Na and began building in 2003. International Community School opened the Bang Na campus in September 2004 with nearly 500 students in four year-old kindergarten through twelfth grade. The original campus at Soi Prong Jai was closed in June 2007. In 2017–2018, ICS expanded its athletic facilities with a new 11-a-side soccer field. They also added four classrooms to the high school side of the campus.

References

External links

International Community School

American international schools in Thailand
International schools in Bangkok
Educational institutions established in 1993
1993 establishments in Thailand
Private schools in Thailand